The Snack Wrap is a menu item available at McDonald's in the United Kingdom and Canada.  It consists of 100% white meat chicken breast (crispy or grilled), lettuce, shredded cheddar jack cheese, Monterey Jack cheese, and sauce (ranch, honey mustard or salsa roja), wrapped in a soft flour tortilla.  It was created to serve as a snack to satisfy hunger between meals.

It was officially launched in the United States in 2006, and was initially only available with crispy chicken and ranch sauce. In early 2007, the option to substitute for grilled chicken and/or honey mustard sauce were made available. In some markets, salsa roja or Chipolte BBQ is also available.

The Snack Wrap was developed as an attempt to create a new chicken item appealing to drive-through customers. The original wrap used the same meat as the Chicken Selects, allowing restaurants to cook batches of the chicken more frequently and provide a fresher product to customers. The menu item was also introduced in order to take advantage of the growing demand for "snack-size", or smaller portion options.

In 2016, the Snack Wrap was officially discontinued in the United States as a result of underwhelming sales and time-consuming construction, though individual franchises could still choose to sell them. However, as a result of menu simplification in 2020 due to the COVID-19 pandemic, the Snack Wrap was removed nationwide. 

A video posted to TikTok on April 7th, 2022, showed a promotion for the Honey Mustard Snack Wrap, leading to the belief that the item was returning stores in the United States on later that year. It was later proven to be a hoax.

It is unknown if or when the snack wrap will return to McDonalds locations in the United States.

Nutrition information
A Snack Wrap with crispy chicken and ranch sauce contains 330 calories (1,380 kJ), 16 grams of fat, 2 grams of trans fat, 35 milligrams of cholesterol, 780 milligrams of sodium, 33 grams of carbohydrates, and 14 grams of protein. The grilled chicken wrap with honey mustard or barbecue has 250 calories.

References

McDonald's foods
Products introduced in 2006
Products and services discontinued in 2016
Products and services discontinued in 2020